Bala is a village and a Gram Panchayat in the Ahore Tehsil of Jalore district of Rajasthan in northwest India.

Geography 
Bala is located in Ahor, Tehsil in the Jalore district of Rajasthan. It is located 38 kilometers north of the district headquarters in Jalore, 27 kilometers from Ahore and 394 kilometers from the state capital, Jaipur.

Demographics 
According to a 2011 census, the population of Bala is 4,264. At the time of the census, there were 2,074 men and 2,190 women. Children ages 0 to 6 make up 14.66 percent of the total population. The average sex ratio of Bala village is 1,056, which is higher than the Rajasthan state average of 928. The sex ratio among children is 959 which is higher than the Rajasthan average of 888.

Bala village has a lower literacy rate than that of the Rajasthan's average. In 2011, the literacy rate of Bala village was 58.97 percent, compared to 66.11 percent of Rajasthan. In Bala, literacy stands at 71.17 percent among men and 47.61 percent among women.

References

Villages in Jalore district